San Gabriel River is the name of watercourses in two states:

 San Gabriel River (California)
 San Gabriel River bicycle path (California)
 San Gabriel River (Texas)